Aabach is a small river in the Ems river system, of North Rhine-Westphalia, Germany. It flows into the Hessel near Versmold.

See also
List of rivers of North Rhine-Westphalia

References

Rivers of North Rhine-Westphalia
Rivers of Germany